Circus Knie is the largest circus of Switzerland, based in Rapperswil.

The circus was founded in 1803 by the Knie family and has existed in its present form since 1919 when it changed from an open arena to a covered tent. The circus has been long famous for its animals and now operates a zoo (Knie's Kinderzoo). Its museum in Rapperswil closed in July 2017. In 1999 Franco Knie was named Best Animal Tamer at the International Circus Festival of Monte-Carlo.  

Today the circus is an enterprise with about 200 employees, operated by Frédy and Franco Knie in partnership with insurance company Swiss Life.

Tightrope acrobat David Dimitri has been associated with the circus. A co-production with Cirque du Soleil was mounted in 1992. In 1999 Karls kühne Gassenschau toured with the Swiss national Circus. In 2000 was the focus on Hanna & Knill including six clown cabarets with Ueli Bichsel, Neda und Maite, and Gardi Hutter. 

Ursus & Nadeschkin became in 2002 the leading act and headline of the Circus Knie, performing 257 times during the 2002 season tour and having an audience totaling one million spectators.

Princess Stéphanie of Monaco travelled with the circus for some months in 2001 and 2002 while in a relationship with Franco Knie.

External links

Circus Knie official website

References 

Circuses
Rapperswil-Jona
Culture of the canton of St. Gallen
Tourist attractions in Rapperswil-Jona